James, Jim or Jimmy McCormick may refer to:
James Hanna McCormick (1875–1955), Northern Ireland politician
James Robinson McCormick (1824–1897), U.S. Representative from Missouri
Jim McCormick (American football) (1884–1959), American football player
Jim McCormick (author) (born 1956), American speaker, author and skydiver
Jim McCormick (infielder) (1868–1948), American baseball player
Jim McCormick (pitcher) (1856–1918), right-handed pitcher in Major League Baseball
Jim McCormick (rugby union) (1923–2006), New Zealand rugby union player
Jim McCormick (songwriter), American songwriter
Jim McCormick, head of the company that manufactured the ADE 651, a fake bomb detector
Jimmy McCormick (1912–1968), English football player and manager
Jimmy McCormick (footballer, born 1883) (1883–1935), English football player